Khao Soi Dao Wildlife Sanctuary is a wildlife sanctuary in Thailand's Chanthaburi Province. It covers the area around Khao Soi Dao Tai and Khao Soi Dao Nuea (south and north Soi Dao mountains), the two highest peaks in the Chanthaburi Mountains of Eastern Thailand, which form part of the much larger Cardamom Mountains extending well into Cambodia. 

The mountains are covered in tropical rainforest and the Chanthaburi River originates from the Khao Soi Dao Tai mountain. The wildlife sanctuary neighbours the smaller Khao Khitchakut National Park to the south and Khao Sip Ha Chan National Park and Khao Ang Rue Nai Wildlife Sanctuary to the northwest.

History
In 2007, the sanctuary was also designated as an Important Bird Area (IBA), thus of global importance for bird conservation.

Fauna 

Khao Soi Dao Wildlife Sanctuary is the only IBA in Thailand supporting the globally endangered Chestnut-headed Partridge (Arborophila cambodiana), but it is home to many more bird species of importance to global conservation. This includes Siamese Fireback (Lophura diardi), Great Hornbill (Buceros bicornis) and Moustached Hawk Cuckoo (Hierococcyx vagans), all of which are near-threatened on a global level. The colourful Blue-rumped Pittas are here, and this is the only place in Thailand where this species live.  

Regarding mammals, the sanctuary is also home to a diverse range of species, with many threatened ones included. Asian Elephants (Elephas maximus indicus), Tiger (Panthera tigris), Asian Golden Cat (Catopuma temminckii) and Gaurs (Bos gaurus) are found here. For monkeys, the Pileated Gibbons (Hylobates pileatus) are notable.

The sanctuary is known as a particularly good spot for watching butterflies, but other insects, such as dragonflies are also here in both abundance and diversity.

Flora 
Close to all (85%) of the forest in Khao Soi Dao Wildlife Sanctuary is monsoon evergreen forest, but patches of deciduous forest and bamboo thickets are also to be found.

Khao Soi Dao Waterfall 
Khao Soi Dao Waterfall ( or Namtok Khao Soi Dao) is a popular tourist destination in the wildlife sanctuary. It is 70 km from the town of Chanthaburi. It springs from Khao Soi Dao Nua at 1,556 meters above sea level and has a total of 16 tiers. The waterfall is located about 4 km from the Wildlife Sanctuary visitor center.

The easy way to get to this waterfall, if you have a car is to go ahead from the city on Route 317 through Makham District and Pong Nam Ron District. At km 62 you should turn left and go ahead 3 km.  This waterfall is open from 6.00am to 6.00pm. The most popular attraction at the falls is nature trails because there is  a huge tree of 4.77 meters diameter.  The waterfall has 16 tiers created by multi-level stone cliffs which gives the impression of a giant stair. At the bottom is a vast pool with shallow water. The popular tier is tier 16 because this tier has a lot of moss on the stone. It feels fresh and is suitable for capturing. This tier is named “Phanangleun” Pha Nang Leun mean “Mrs. Slippery cliff” because the careless traveller can slip on the moss on a stone when he walks through. The source of the waterfall is near the Peak of KhaoSoi Dao Nua Mountain at 1,556 meters above sea level. The area suitable for butterflies watching and the study of plants.

References 

Wildlife sanctuaries of Thailand
Chanthaburi province
Cardamom Mountains
IUCN Category IV
1972 establishments in Thailand
Protected areas established in 1972